Cuphanoa is a genus of moths of the family Noctuidae. The species of this genus are of dull color, and frequent blossoming sallows in early spring. The proboscis and palpi are rather short, but the third joint of the latter, though short, is visible. The legs are short and very hairy. These moths are usually called "Quakers" by collectors. They have a general resemblance to the Bombyces, and were classed with them by some older writers. They are moths with stout, hairy bodies; and the abdomen, which extends a little beyond the hind-wings, is obtuse in the male, and more or less pointed in the female.

References
Natural History Museum Lepidoptera genus database
 Common Quaker Cuphanoa Cerasi Butterflies by Lloyd Kirby, 1896

Hadeninae